Tailteann may refer to:
 Teltown  (genitive ), townland in County Meath, Ireland
 Tailteann Games (ancient), Gaelic festival held at Teltown until the twelfth century
 Tailteann Games (Irish Free State), Gaelic sports and cultural festival held 1924–1932
 Tailteann Cup, second-tier inter-county Gaelic football competition introduced in 2022
 Rás Tailteann, annual Irish road cycling stage race
 Páirc Tailteann, Gaelic games stadium in Navan, County Meath, Ireland